Leo Anthony "Crystal" Klier (May 21, 1923 – June 4, 2005) was an American professional basketball player.

Collegiate career
Klier, a 6'2 guard/forward, played collegiately at Notre Dame after a standout high school career at Washington High School in Washington, Indiana.  He played for the Fighting Irish from 1942-1946.  Klier was named a consensus first-team All-American in 1944 as he notched Notre Dame's single-season scoring record (since broken).  However, Klier missed the 1944-45 season as he served in the United States Navy during World War II.  Klier returned and was again named a consensus first-team All-American in 1946.

He was elected to the Indiana Basketball Hall of Fame in 1977 and was selected to the Notre Dame All-Century basketball team in 2004.

Professional career
Following his collegiate career, Klier played Indianapolis Kautskys of the National Basketball League from 1946–48.  During the 1948-49 and 1949-50 seasons, Klier played in 113 games for the Fort Wayne Pistons, averaging 7.4 points per game. He then finished his career with the Anderson Packers for the 1950–51 season.

Leo Klier died on June 4, 2005 in Naperville, Illinois.

BAA/NBA career statistics

Regular season

Playoffs

References

External links

Indiana Basketball Hall of Fame page

1923 births
2005 deaths
All-American college men's basketball players
American men's basketball players
United States Navy personnel of World War II
Anderson Packers coaches
Anderson Packers players
Basketball coaches from Indiana
Basketball players from Indiana
Fort Wayne Pistons players
Forwards (basketball)
Indianapolis Kautskys players
Notre Dame Fighting Irish men's basketball players
People from Washington, Indiana
Player-coaches
Shooting guards
Sportspeople from Naperville, Illinois